is a Japanese paralympic cross country skier. He participated at the 2022 Winter Paralympics in the 20 kilometre classical event and won the gold medal with a time of 52:52.8.

References 

Living people
2001 births
Cross-country skiers at the 2022 Winter Paralympics
Medalists at the 2022 Winter Paralympics
Paralympic gold medalists for Japan
Paralympic medalists in cross-country skiing